The 1919 Davidson Wildcats football team was an American football team that represented the Davidson College as a member of the South Atlantic Intercollegiate Athletic Association (SAIAA) during the 1919 college football season. In their first year under head coach Pete Crayton, the team compiled a 4–6–1 record.

Schedule

References

Davidson Wildcats
Davidson Wildcats football seasons
Davidson Wildcats football